Sanju Weds Geetha is a 2011 Indian Kannada-language romance film directed and written by Nagashekar and produced by Pramod Narayan, starring Srinagar Kitty and Ramya in the lead roles. Jassie Gift composed the soundtrack, while Sadhu Kokila composed the background score. The film was released on 1 April 2011.

The film was successful at the box-office upon release and won many critical acclaims and awards including the Karnataka State Film Awards, Filmfare Awards South and Suvarna Film Awards in various categories. The movie was remade in 2017 in Bengali as Tomake Chai.

Plot
Sanju Weds Geetha begins with Sanjay "Sanju" graduating in computer science with top marks — immediately after which he leaves to his hometown Kodagu. There he meets Geetha who is seen helping a beggar, and he is instantly infatuated. He pursues her to like him too. After several attempts, the strict and strong-willed Geetha gives into Sanju's good nature and they soon become very close. When Geetha reveals a dark childhood story to Sanju that involves her being abused by her cousin, Sanju looks past the incident and likes her even more.

The evil cousin finds out about the romance between Sanju and Geetha and then he misbehaves with Geetha. She pleads Sanju to marry her soon; he agrees and tells her that they would marry the very next day. Geetha runs away from her house. On the way, the evil cousin abducts and molests her. Sanju finds out something is amiss and finds Geetha before rescuing her. He gives the cousin a chase, hunts him down and fatally stabs him with a knife.

Sanju is sentenced for life for the murder. When Geetha visits him in jail, he asks her to marry someone else. She becomes more depressed. On one occasion, Geetha visits one of their previous meeting spots. She slips from the lookout, hurts her head, and loses her memory. A series of tragic events follow leading to the ultimate death of Sanju and Geetha.

Cast

Soundtrack

Jassie Gift's music and Kaviraj's lyrics for the movie have been widely appreciated and is considered one of the top chartbusters. The soundtrack album consists of seven soundtracks. Jassie Gift reused the composition of "Gaganave Baagi" for the song "Arikil Ninnalum" in the Malayalam film China Town.

Reception

Critical response 

Shruti Indira Lakshminarayana from Rediff.com scored the film at 3 out of 5 stars and says "Nagashekar dedicates this film to his inspiration -- actor-director the late Shankar Nag who surely would have been a happy man. Watch Sanju Weds Geetha for classy performances and visual extravagance". A critic from The New Indian Express wrote "Sadhu Kokila’s background music is apt. Songs, especially ‘Sanju mathu Geetha’, are melodious. The movie is worth watching provided you can cope with post-intermission session loaded with sentiment". A critic from The Times of India scored the film at 3.5 out of 5 stars and wrote "Music director Jassie Gift wins your heart with his melodious tunes to the lyrics of Kaviraj and Nagendra Prasad and equally good is Imran Sardaria''s choreography. Manjunath Sanjiv has some catchy dialogues for you. Sathya Hegde needs a special mention for his brilliant cinematography." B S Srivani from Deccan Herald wrote "Nagendra Prasad and Kaviraj all pitch in for a seamless transition from cute love story to hard hitting drama. Perhaps, it is time for the audience to shake off the cobwebs of cynicism and lethargy and appreciate a simple, wholesome fare". A critic from Bangalore Mirror wrote  "Despite some of the glitches and the some dull scenes here and there, Sanju Weds Geetha has all the ammunition to draw people to cinema halls. Overall, it is a terrific attempt".

Awards

References

External links 

2011 films
2010s Kannada-language films
2011 romantic drama films
Films shot in Ooty
Kannada films remade in other languages
Indian romantic drama films